Michael or Mike Houston may refer to:
 Michael Houston (football manager), Irish Gaelic football manager
 J. Michael Houston (born 1944), mayor of Springfield, Illinois
 Mike Houston (American football) (born 1971), American college football coach
 Mike Houston (actor) (born 1976), American actor

See also
 Michael Houstoun (born 1952), New Zealand concert pianist